Malavika Avinash (born 28 January 1976) is an Indian spokesperson, actress, television personality and politician who is the current State spokesperson of Bharatiya Janata Party of Karnataka.  She is known for her work in Kannada and Tamil films. She hosted Baduku Jataka Bandi, a television show that aired on Zee Kannada. She is a part of the ensemble cast in the highest grossing Kannada movie - K.G.F: Chapter 2.

Early life 
Malavika was born on 28 January 1976, in a Tamil family to N. Ganesan. Her father was a banker and writer, and her mother, Savithri, a vocalist and dancer. She was initiated into classical arts under the tutelage of Padmashree Leela Samson in Bharatanatyam and Pandit Partho Das on the sitar. G. V. Iyer spotted her at a dance performance as Krishna and cast her as Krishna in his Krishnavataar. She then played a lead role as a princess in Prema Karanth's Panorama children's film Nakkala Rajakumari.

She completed her Bachelor of Law at Bangalore University and was awarded 3rd rank.

She married actor Avinash in 2001. They have a son named Gaalav.

Career 
Malavika's stint as a child artist was followed by her entry into cinema as the heroine in award-winning Malayalam films for Lenin Rajendran and popular Kannada films. Television however, turned out to be the medium that adopted her. Her earlier television series were for Girish Karnad and Ashutosh Gowariker in Hindi, Ashok Naidu in Kannada and Dinesh Baboo in Malayalam. Her performance in Mayamruga provided her iconic status among Kannada television viewers. Mayamrugas success caught the eye of K. Balachander, who then chose to usher her into Tamil cinema world with Anni, where Malavika played the protagonist Anni.

Malavika's Tamil films and Serials include Raji Or Raja Rajeshwari Role in "Raja Rajeshwari" Sun TV Serial 90'S Kids Favourite (Saregama India Ltd) Company Episodes Directors are Selva Kumar and Selva Pandi and K. Balachander's Nilavai Pidippom where she portrayed a middle-class working woman, Pudhuyugam, Pralayam in "Comedy Colony" again under her mentor Balachander. She played  Madurai Thilaka in Arasi and Muththazhagi in Chellamey. She played key roles in Tamil films.

Another milestone was her portrayal of Nanjamma, the protagonist in Girish Kasaravalli's film of S. L. Bhyrappa's celebrated novel, Gruha Banga. In her decade of television acting, Malavika played roles in Tamil, Kannada and Hindi productions including cross-over film Cyanide, in which Malavika's portrayal of Shubha won her critical acclaim.  Apart from Manvantara for T. N. Seetharam, Malavika swayed the Kannada audiences with her cult figure like character of Madhavi Patel, IPS, in his Muktha.

Agni, a talk show that Malavika hosted on E-TV Kannada was followed by Baduku Jataka Bandi. In the latter, Malavika deals with the problems of individuals, thereby providing an Alternate Dispute Resolution forum for resolving family issues. She also discusses social issues. She was a housemate in Bigg Boss Kannada Season 4.

In 2017, she played a judge in Ilayathalapathy Vijay's movie Bairavaa. She also starred in the current highest grossing Kannada film K.G.F: Chapter 1 as well as the highly acclaimed Tamil  movie Kaithi, all 3 which have grossed more than 100 crores at the box office and the sequel of KGF, K.G.F: Chapter 2 which is India's 3rd highest-grossing film of all time grossing more than 1000 crore at the box office.

Journalism 
Malavika participated in and won many international moot courts as a student, served as editor of her college journal, joined Madhyam, a development communications organization, served as assistant-editors of Madhyam journal, a legal column for the Times of India and UDAYAVANI for two years, her "Malavika Pakkam" column in Kumudam, a Tamil weekly, an Agony aunt column for Kumudam and more recently, 'Malavika order', a weekly column in Vijaya Karnataka. Malavika served as head of programming at Zee Kannada.

Dance 

Malavika's association with Bharatanatyam commenced at age five when her mother introduced it to her. She trained under M. R. Krishnamurthy of Kalakshetra, followed by advanced tutelage under Padmashri Leela Samson in Delhi. She was a recipient of the CCERT (a unit of the Culture Ministry) scholarship for Bharatanatyam. She pursued dance along with her dancer sister, an alumnus of Kalakshetra, Ranjani Ganesan Ramesh. As a duo they performed at cultural centres in India and abroad, including Hampi festival, Pattadakkal festival, Khujrajo festival, Chidambaram Natyanjali and Uttara Chidambaram. Together, they organise an annual dance festival called Arudhra at Bangalore.

Malavika served as a judge on TV dance shows and hosted Takadhimithaa, a game show dedicated to Bharatanatyam on JayaTV.

Malavika Avinash entered politics campaigning for BJP leader Sushma Swaraj in Bellary. She is a member of the BJP's Mahila Morcha. She joined Bharatiya Janata Party in September 2013 and was appointed one of its co-spokespersons in February 2014.

Controversy

Sanitary pad controversy 
Goods and Service Tax applied on sanitary napkins when items like bangles and sindhoor were exempted from the new tax system by the ruling Bhartiya Janata Party has come under criticism from women and men. In July 2017, Malavika defended the BJP and said that sanitary pads are not required as Multi-national corporations have been dumping sanitary pads in India since it was rejected by developed countries, Cloth is hygienic in contrast to sanitary pads. The defense of Malavika on the decision of her party to enforce GST on sanitary pads provoked a lot of backlash from people.

Filmography

Television career 
Serials

Shows

Awards and honours 

 Best Actress award given by the Tamil Nadu government
 Kalaimamani award for her achievements as an actress
 Aryabhata award
 Kempegowda award

References

External links 
 

Living people
20th-century Indian actresses
21st-century Indian actresses
21st-century Indian politicians
21st-century Indian women politicians
Actresses from Chennai
Actresses in Malayalam cinema
Actresses in Kannada cinema
Actresses in Kannada television
Actresses in Tamil cinema
Actresses in Tamil television
Indian actor-politicians
Indian film actresses
Indian television actresses
Politicians from Chennai
Tamil television actresses
Television personalities from Tamil Nadu
1976 births